The RAF Army Co-operation Command was a short-lived command of the Royal Air Force during the Second World War, comprising the army cooperation units of the RAF.

The command was formed on 1 December 1940 when No. 22 (Army Co-Operation) Group, previously a part of Fighter Command, was raised to command status.  Initially it controlled two groups: No. 70 Group RAF for training and No. 71 Group RAF for operations.  In August 1941, 71 Group re-organized its squadrons into a Wing basis.  Each wing was directly attached to a UK based Army regional Command.

Its function was to act as the focus for activities connected with the interaction of the British Army and the RAF, such as close air support, tactical reconnaissance, artillery spotting and training of anti-aircraft defences.  It was also responsible for developing tactics for the invasion of Europe, where direct air support proved to be decisive.

Army Co-Operation Command proved to be controversial, with the Chief of the Imperial General Staff General Sir Alan Brooke being an implacable foe of the command arrangement. It was disbanded on 31 March 1943, when most of its units were used to form the Second Tactical Air Force.

The command had only had one commander during its short existence, Air Marshal Sir Arthur Barratt.

Army Co-operation Command (April 1942)
No. 70 (Army Co-operation Training) Group – 1 December 1940 – 1 June 1943 (transferred to ADGB)
 No. 41 OTU – Lysander / Tomahawk – RAF Old Sarum
 No. 42 OTU – Various Aircraft – RAF Andover
 No. 271 Squadron RAF – Albatross / Dominie – RAF Doncaster
 No. 651 Squadron RAF – Taylorcraft I – RAF Old Sarum
 Various other flights and minor training units.
Wings
 No. 32 Wing – Scottish Command – Edinburgh
 No. 309 (Polish) Squadron RAF – Lysander – RAF Dunino
 No. 614 Squadron RAF – Blenheim – RAF Macmerry
 No. 33 Wing – Northern Command – York
 No. 613 Squadron RAF – Tomahawk I/II – RAF Doncaster
 No. 4 Squadron RAF – Tomahawk I/II – RAF York
 No. 34 Wing – Eastern Command – Luton
 No. 140 Squadron RAF – Spitfire PR.I – RAF Benson
 No. 241 Squadron RAF – Tomahawk I/II – RAF Bottisham
 No. 2 Squadron RAF – Tomahawk I/II   RAF Sawbridgeworth
 No. 268 Squadron RAF – Tomahawk I/II – RAF Snailwell
 No. 35 Wing – South Eastern Command – Reigate
 No. 26 Squadron RAF – Tomahawk I/II – RAF Gatwick
 No. 239 Squadron RAF – Tomahawk I/II – RAF Gatwick
 No. 400 Squadron RCAF – Tomahawk I/II – RAF Odiham
 No. 414 Squadron RCAF – Tomahawk I/II – RAF Croydon
 No. 36 Wing – South Western Command – Salisbury
 No. 16 Squadron RAF – Tomahawk I/II – RAF Weston Zoyland
 1492 TTF – Lysander – RAF Weston Zoyland
 No. 225 Squadron RAF – Lysander – RAF Thruxton
 No. 13 Squadron RAF – Blenheim – RAF Odiham
 No. 37 Wing – Western Command – Chester
 No active squadrons assigned.
 No 38 Wing – Airborne Division – RAF Netheravon
 No. 296 Squadron RAF – Hart/Hector – RAF Netheravon
 No. 297 Squadron RAF – Whitley – RAF Netheravon
 RAF Northern Ireland – Belfast
 No. 231 Squadron RAF – Tomahawk I/II – RAF Maghaberry
 1494 TTF – Lysander/Tomahawk – RAF Long Kesh

See also

 List of Royal Air Force commands

References
Notes

Bibliography

 Delve, Ken. The Source Book of the RAF. Shrewsbury, Shropshire, UK: Airlife Publishing Ltd., 1994. .

External links
 "The Army's Wings are in the news" contemporary reporting of Army Cooperation Command

Army Cooperation Command
Military units and formations established in 1940
Military units and formations of the Royal Air Force in World War II
Military units and formations disestablished in 1943
1940 establishments in the United Kingdom
1943 disestablishments in the United Kingdom